Philip Reilly Stendek is a contemporary United States musician self-described as a loop artist. He performs by recording samples of music while on stage, which he plays on a variety of instruments, and then playing them back as the accompaniment for his vocals and guitar work.

He describes the origin of his stage name as derived from the  Star Dust airliner disappearance.

The name "Stendek" comes from an alien abduction theory surrounding a 1947 airplane crash over the Andes Mountains... When I first started looping, the process felt very "alien" to me, and the name Stendek just made sense.

In October 2010, Philip won 1st place in the BOSS US Loopstation Championship.

External links 
 
 "Killers ink killer deal" Las Vegas City Life

Living people
Year of birth missing (living people)